Kyle David Barraclough ( born May 23, 1990) is an American professional baseball pitcher who is currently a free agent. He previously played for the Miami Marlins, Washington Nationals, San Francisco Giants, Minnesota Twins and Los Angeles Angels.

Career
After graduating from Wilcox High School in Santa Clara, California, Barraclough played college baseball at St. Mary's College of California. In 2011, his junior year, he had a 6–5 win–loss record with a 3.60 earned run average (ERA) in 15 games (14 starts). After the season, he was drafted by the Minnesota Twins in the 40th round of the 2011 MLB draft, but did not sign. As a senior in 2012, he pitched to a 2–9 record with a 3.95 ERA in 84 innings.

St. Louis Cardinals
Barraclough was drafted by the St. Louis Cardinals in the seventh round, 240th overall, of the 2012 Major League Baseball draft. He signed with the Cardinals and made his professional debut with the Low-A Batavia Muckdogs. In 15 games between Batavia and the Single-A Quad Cities River Bandits, Barraclough posted a 3.06 ERA with 33 strikeouts. In 2013, he played for the Rookie-level GCL Cardinals, struggling to a 13.50 ERA in 3 appearances and missing most of the season due to injury. He split the 2014 season between the Single-A Peoria Chiefs and the High-A Palm Beach Cardinals, pitching to a cumulative 2–2 record and 2.45 ERA in 48 appearances between the two teams. In 2015, after logging a stellar 0.60 ERA in 11 games for Palm Beach, Barraclough received a promotion to the Double-A Springfield Cardinals, where he was named a Texas League All-Star after recording a 3.28 ERA with 28 strikeouts in 24.2 innings pitched.

Miami Marlins
On July 24, 2015, Barraclough was traded to the Miami Marlins for Steve Cishek. He was called up to the majors for the first time on August 7, 2015. He struck out Joey Terdoslavich for his first Major League strikeout. He finished 2–1 with a 2.59 ERA in  innings, he struck out 30 while issuing 18 walks. In 2016, he struck out 113 in just  innings. He also issued 44 walks. The next season he appeared in 66 games, striking out 76 in 66 innings. On June 3, 2018, he replaced Brad Ziegler as closer.

Washington Nationals

On October 10, 2018, Barraclough was traded to the Washington Nationals for international slot value. He was sent down to the Harrisburg Senators of the Class AA Eastern League on July 27, 2019, after struggling to a 6.66 ERA in 33 appearances. On August 6, 2019, Barraclough was designated for assignment.

San Francisco Giants
On August 9, 2019, the San Francisco Giants claimed Barraclough from the Nationals off of waivers. On August 15, Barraclough was designated for assignment. He was outrighted to the Triple-A Sacramento River Cats on August 16. On September 2, the Giants selected Barraclough's contract. Barraclough was designated for assignment on October 30 and elected free agency on November 1.

San Diego Padres
On December 17, 2019, Barraclough signed a minor league contract with the San Diego Padres organization. He elected free agency on July 14, 2020.

New York Yankees
On February 2, 2021, Barraclough signed a minor league contract with the New York Yankees organization and was invited to Spring Training. Barraclough pitched to a 3.21 ERA in 14.0 innings of work for the Triple-A Scranton/Wilkes-Barre RailRiders, but was released on June 18, 2021.

Minnesota Twins
On June 20, 2021, Barraclough signed a minor league contract with the Minnesota Twins organization and was assigned to the Triple-A St. Paul Saints. After posting a 2.86 ERA with 31 strikeouts and 18 appearances for St. Paul, the Twins selected Barraclough's contract on August 19. Barraclough entered in relief for the Twins against the Yankees on August 20.  Barraclough made 10 appearances for the Twins, going 2–0 with a 5.54 ERA and 18 strikeouts. On October 8, Barraclough was outrighted off of the 40-man roster. On October 14, Barraclough elected free agency.

Los Angeles Angels
On January 13, 2022, Barraclough signed a minor league contract with the Los Angeles Angels. He was assigned to the Triple-A Salt Lake Bees to begin the year.

On May 7, 2022, Barraclough was selected to the 40-man and active rosters. He was outrighted off the roster on June 30. He finished the season at 0–1 record with a 3.00 ERA and nine strikeouts in eight games. On October 14, Barraclough elected to become a free agent.

Personal
Barraclough grew up a Giants fan.

References

External links

Saint Mary Gaels bio

1990 births
Living people
Sportspeople from Santa Clara, California
Baseball players from California
Major League Baseball pitchers
Miami Marlins players
Washington Nationals players
San Francisco Giants players
Minnesota Twins players
Los Angeles Angels players
Saint Mary's Gaels baseball players
Batavia Muckdogs players
Quad Cities River Bandits players
Gulf Coast Cardinals players
Peoria Chiefs players
Palm Beach Cardinals players
Springfield Cardinals players
Jacksonville Suns players
Gulf Coast Nationals players
Potomac Nationals players
Harrisburg Senators players
Sacramento River Cats players
Scranton/Wilkes-Barre RailRiders players
St. Paul Saints players
Peninsula Oilers players